Boetius Egan (1734–1798) was a Roman Catholic Archbishop of Tuam in County Galway, Ireland.
 
Egan was born near Tuam, Ireland, to a family owning large estates in the County Galway.  His family was reduced in position and means, and British Penal Laws made it then difficult for an Irish Catholic to receive Catholic education at home.  At some point, he went to France to be trained as a priest.  Egan attended the College of Bordeaux, there, which had been founded by Irish exiles and endowed by queen Anne in the seventeenth century.
 
After his ordination Egan returned to Ireland and served as a priest until he was appointed Bishop of Achonry in 1785. Two years later he was appointed Archbishop of Tuam. Accustomed during his whole life in Ireland to the barest toleration of his religion, he welcomed the Catholic Relief Act of 1793, and hastened to express his gratitude to king George III. When Maynooth College was founded in 1795, he became one of its trustees.
 
One of his last public acts was to sign an address to the Irish viceroy, Lord Camden, condemning the revolutionary associations then in Ireland. In this address Egan described George III as "the best of kings" and the Irish Parliament as "our enlightened legislature".

See also
 Egan (surname)
 Mac Aodhagáin

Sources
 

1734 births
1798 deaths
Irish expatriates in France
18th-century Roman Catholic archbishops in Ireland
People from County Galway
Roman Catholic archbishops of Tuam
Roman Catholic bishops of Achonry